Gary Gamutan Granada (born April 4, 1960 in Maco, Davao de Oro) is a well-known Filipino musician, composer, poet, and singer-songwriter known for writing songs which have strong political themes.

He is also a tutor at the University of the Philippines, a union organizer, broadcaster, voice talent,  and a board member in several organizations, among other things.

Early life
Granada was born in 1960 to mother Cristina Gamutan (a dressmaker) and father Ireneo (a fisherman). Growing up, he took a number of odd jobs to help support the presumably feeble family income. He graduated valedictorian in both elementary and high school but never attained a diploma in college (he enrolled in the University of the Philippines but was booted out).

Musical career
Granada learned the ukulele at his father's insistence, learned how to play guitar proficiently as well, got up to grade one in piano, and never learned how to read music. He made a lot of compositions: topical compositions as well as advertising jingles, with some becoming hits at one time or another.

Granada is also an avid Barangay Ginebra San Miguel fan, and composed numerous songs about the Ginebra San Miguel Kings basketball team; "Ginebrang Ginebra"; "Kapag Nananalo ang Ginebra (When Ginebra Wins)" sung by Bayang Barrios; and "Kapag Natatalo ang Ginebra (When Ginebra Loses)", sung by himself. The latest of these tribute songs was "Dugong Ginebra", written right after the 2008 PBA Fiesta Conference championship.

In 2009, Granada accused the GMA Kapuso Foundation of violating his intellectual property rights.

In 2017, Granada commissioned with Mariano Kilates in writing the City Hymn of Legazpi "Legazpi Ngonyan (Legazpi Today)". The City hymn was installed in September 2017.

Popular songs by Gary Granada
Mabuti Pa Sila (1998 Grand Prize Champion, Metropop Song Festival 1998, also covered by the late Rico J. Puno in 2008.)

References

Filipino songwriters
Filipino poets
Living people
Rock songwriters
Filipino singer-songwriters
People from Davao de Oro
1960 births